The year 1996 in archaeology involved some significant events.

Explorations
 Preliminary survey of Buckton Castle in the north west of England.

Excavations
 Large-scale, wide-scope horizontal excavations begin at Daepyeong, a large Mumun Pottery Period settlement in Korea (continued until early 2000).
 Excavations near Bogazköy by the Deutsche Orient-Gesellschaft begin (continued until 1999).
 Excavation of the Portuguese nau Nossa Senhora dos Mártires (1605–06) at the mouth of the Tagus begins (continued until 2001).
 First excavation of medieval drain at Paisley Abbey in Scotland.

Publications
 Matthew Johnson - An Archaeology of Capitalism (Blackwell).
 Denise Schmandt-Besserat - How Writing Came About (University of Texas Press).
 Rita P. Wright (ed.) - Gender and Archaeology (University of Pennsylvania Press).
 First issue of e-journal Internet Archaeology.

Finds
 July: Mass grave of victims of the Battle of Towton (1461) in England.
 July 28: Kennewick Man in the United States.
 August 4: Seaton Carew Wreck in England.
 November 21: Pirate flagship Queen Anne's Revenge (run aground 1718) in North Carolina.
 Herxheim archaeological site, a Neolithic Linear Pottery culture ritual center and mass grave at Herxheim in southwest Germany.
 Ekron Royal Dedicatory Inscription in Israel.
 Lod Mosaic in Israel.
 Croatian Apoxyomenos off the Croatian islet of Vele Orjule.
 Ōfune Site, one of the Jōmon Archaeological Sites in Hokkaidō, Japan.
 "Great Dover Street woman" from Roman Britain in London.
 Polychrome wall paintings (dated to 1090) at church of St Mary the Virgin in the deserted village of Houghton on the Hill, Norfolk, England.

Awards

Events
 Yale University Bonampak Documentation Project begins at Maya site of Bonampak.
 November 2: Sendai City Tomizawa Site Museum opens in Japan.

Births

Deaths
 January 17- William Lamplough, British archaeologist (b. 1914).
 March 18 - Jacquetta Hawkes, British archaeologist (b. 1910).
 September 23 - Stuart Piggott, British archaeologist (b. 1910).
 November 14 - Martyn Jope, British archaeologist and biochemist (b. 1915).
 December 9 - Mary Leakey, British archaeologist and anthropologist (b. 1913).

References

Archaeology
Archaeology by year
Archaeology